Gianni Minervini (26 October 1928 – 4 February 2020) was an Italian television and film producer.

Born in Naples, Minervini was the son of the journalist  Roberto Minervini. He debuted as a producer in 1976, when he co-founded with the brothers Antonio and Pupi Avati the production company A.M.A. Film. The Avati brothers left the company in late 1983, leaving the sole Minervini leading the company alone.

Minervini won three David di Donatello Awards for best producer, in 1982, 1984 and 1990. He also won a Nastro d'Argento in 1984 for the production of Where's Picone?.

Selected filmography 

 1960 – Toto, Fabrizi and the Young People Today
 1976  – The House with Laughing Windows  
 1977  – Berlinguer, I Love You  
   1979   – Mimi  
   1980   – Macabre
   1981   – Help Me Dream
   1983   – A School Outing
   1983   – Zeder 
   1984   – Where's Picone?
   1985   – Secrets Secrets  
   1986   – Summer Night
  1986  – The Bride Was Beautiful
   1987   – The Strangeness of Life  
   1988   – What if Gargiulo Finds Out? 
   1989   – Marrakech Express
   1990   – On Tour 
  1991 – Mediterraneo 
  1992  – Gangsters 
   1996   – Sacred Silence
   1998  – The Dust of Naples  
   2010   – Dark Love

References

External links 
 

1928 births
2020 deaths
Male actors from Naples
Italian film producers
David di Donatello winners
Nastro d'Argento winners
Film people from Naples